Generation Z (or Gen Z for short), colloquially known as Zoomers, is the demographic cohort succeeding Millennials and preceding Generation Alpha. This article focuses specifically on Generation Z in the United States.

Members of Generation Z were born between the mid-to-late 1990s and early 2010s, meaning the first wave came of age during the second decade of the twenty-first century, a time of significant demographic change due to fertility differentials and immigration. Youth of the early twenty-first century reach puberty earlier than their counterparts from the previous century. They have higher incidents of eye problems, allergies, awareness and reporting of mental health issues, suicide, and sleep deprivation, but lower rates of adolescent pregnancy. They drink alcohol and smoke traditional tobacco cigarettes less often, but are more likely to consume marijuana and electronic cigarettes.

Americans who grew up in the 2000s and 2010s saw gains in IQ points, but loss in creativity. During the 2000s and 2010s, while Western educators in general and American schoolteachers in particular concentrated on helping struggling rather than gifted students, American students of the 2010s were trailing behind their counterparts from other countries, especially East Asia, in reading and in STEM. They ranked above the OECD average in science and computer literacy, but below average in mathematics.

Although they tend to become familiar with the Internet and portable digital devices at a young age, they are not necessarily digitally literate. Moreover, they read books less often than their predecessors and spend more time in front of a screen. 

Although they trust traditional news media more than what they see online, they tend to be more skeptical of the news than their parents. Politically, young Americans of the late 2010s and early 2020s tend to hold similar views to the Millennials. They are also more likely to be irreligious than older cohorts. 

On the whole, they are financially cautious, and are increasingly interested in alternatives to attending institutions of higher education, with young men being primarily responsible for the trend. As consumers, Generation Z's actual purchases do not reflect widely reported polling results.

Nomenclature and date range 

The name Generation Z is a reference to the fact that it is the second generation after Generation X, continuing the alphabetical sequence from Generation Y (Millennials). Other proposed names for the generation include iGeneration, Homeland Generation, Net Gen, Digital Natives, Neo-Digital Natives, Pluralist Generation, Centennials, and Post-Millennials. The term Internet Generation is in reference to the fact that the generation is the first to have been born after the mass-adoption of the Internet. The Pew Research Center surveyed the various names for this cohort on Google Trends in 2019 and found that in the U.S., the term Generation Z was overwhelmingly the most popular. The Merriam-Webster Dictionary has an official entry for Generation Z. Zoomer is an informal term used to refer to members of Generation Z, often in an ironic, humorous, or mocking tone. It combines the term boomer, referring to baby boomers, with the "Z" from Generation Z. Prior to this, Zoomer was used in the 2000s to describe particularly active baby boomers. Zoomer in its current incarnation skyrocketed in popularity in 2018, when it was used in a 4chan Internet meme mocking Gen Z adolescents via a Wojak caricature dubbed a Zoomer.  Merriam-Webster's records suggest the use of the term zoomer in the sense of Generation Z dates back at least as far as 2016. It was added to the dictionary in October 2021.

The Pew Research Center defines the "Post-Millennials" as people born from 1997 onward, choosing this date for "different formative experiences." Such experiences include technological developments and socioeconomic trends, including the widespread availability of wireless internet access and high-bandwidth cellular service, and key world events, such as growing up in a world after the September 11th terrorist attacks. Pew stated that they have yet to set an endpoint of Generation Z, but they did have 2012 for the purposes of an analysis in 2019.

In a 2022 report, the U.S. Census designates Generation Z as "the youngest generation with adult members (born 1997 to 2013)."

Arts and culture

Museum attendance and reading 

According to the 2009 Museum Financial Survey conducted by the American Alliance of Museums, museums in the U.S. spend 75% of their education budgets on activities for K-12 students and receive 55 million visits from students traveling in field trips with their schools each year. Data collected by the Institute of Museum and Library Services reveal that the total number of programs per 1,000 people increased between 2007 and 2016. Attendance per 1,000 people also rose. In particular, the number of children's programs offered per 1,000 people and program attendance per 1,000 went up noticeably. During the same time period, the number of children's material in circulation per person did not change. In the fiscal year of 2014, there were more museums in the United States (35,000) than the total numbers of Starbucks locations (11,000) and McDonald's restaurants (14,000) combined.

Originally, there were only twelfth graders; eighth- and tenth graders were added in 1991. They concluded that "compared with previous generations, teens in the 2010s spent more time online and less time with traditional media, such as books, magazines and television. Time on digital media has displaced time once spent enjoying a book or watching TV." Between 2006 and 2016, usage of digital media increased 100% among twelfth-graders, 75% among tenth-graders, and 68% among eighth-graders. Twelfth-graders spent a grand total of six hours each day texting, social networking, or gaming in the mid-2010s. In 2016, only two out of a hundred tenth-graders read a newspaper every day, down from one in three in the early 1990s. That same year, only 16% of twelfth-graders read a book or a magazine daily, down from 60% in the 1970s. Twelfth-graders also read on average two fewer books per year in the mid-2016 than the mid-1970s, and a third did not read books at all (including e-books) compared to one-ninth in the 1970s. Gaps along sexual, racial, or socioeconomic lines were statistically insignificant. This secular decline in leisure reading came as a surprise for the researchers because "It's so convenient to read books and magazines on electronic devices like tablets. There's no more going to the mailbox or the bookstore—you just download the magazine issue or book and start reading." Twenge further noted that the analyses of the Pew Research Center on reading did not distinguish between reading for school or work and reading for pleasure.

News media 
For its 2019 Digital News Report, the Reuters Institute for the Study of Journalism at Oxford University asked people in the U.S. and U.K. what the first sources of news for them were. 45% of people aged 18 to 24 gave the smartphone as their answer. Of those, 57% said social media, including messaging apps, were the source of their first news. Among the social networks, Facebook was the top source for news for 48% of Generation Z, while YouTube was in second place at 32%. Only 23% said their first contact with the first news they read or watch each day came directly from the original sources. Meanwhile, 19% answered TV, 11% the radio, 5% desktop computers, and 4% newspapers as their first sources of news for the day. For Generation Z, the news brands are not as important as they are for those aged 35 or over. Most, however, do have a go-to source when a story breaks; CNN and The New York Times are the most common ones for American youths thanks to parental influence.

Similarly, a 2019 survey by Barnes and Nobles Education found that The New York Times, The Washington Post, The Wall Street Journal, CNN and USA Today are deemed the most trustworthy news sources by Generation Z. They also found that Generation Z consider traditional print media to be the most trustworthy while words of mouth and what they see on social media to be the least trustworthy. Nevertheless, according to the Reuters Institute, while Generation Z understands the importance of traditional news agencies, they tend to be less loyal than their parents. Young Americans (and Britons) are concerned about the perceived bias, lack of context, negativity, and sensationalism in the news media. American youths today want news stories that are not only fun and meaningful but also accurate and fair. A 2016 poll by Gallup found that barely one in three Americans had a "great deal" or "fair" amount of trust in the news media, whose public image has been in decline since the 1990s. This trend holds across different age groups, though people aged 18 to 49 are less likely than those 50 years of age or older to trust the media. Globally, trust in the news media is falling, too. While visual story-telling has proven to be popular, 58% of Generation Z still prefer text to videos. This number goes up for people who are older. In the U.S., despite a bump due to the 2016 Presidential election, the number of people paying a subscription fee for online news has stabilized at about 16%. When asked what they would choose if they could have only one subscription, only 7% picked the news while 37% chose a video service and 15% selected music.

Entertainment 

In its 2018 Gen Z Music Consumption & Spending Report, digital media company Sweety High found that Generation Z was listening to more diverse music than generations past. That they tended to switch seamlessly between different genres is significant because music preferences tend to solidify when people are 13 to 14 years old. Spotify was the most popular source of music Generation Z (61%) and terrestrial radio ranked second (55%). YouTube was the preferred platform for music discovery (75%). However, only one in four teens uses it for regular listening, making it less popular than even CDs (38%). A 2019 poll by Ypulse found that among teenagers (13 to 18) the top musicians were Billie Eilish and Ariana Grande whereas among young adults (19 to 26), the most liked were Taylor Swift and Ariana Grande.

Using artificial intelligence, Joan Serra and his team at the Spanish National Research Council studied the massive Million Song Dataset and found that between 1955 and 2010, popular music has gotten louder, while the chords, melodies, and types of sounds used have become increasingly homogenized. While the music industry has long been accused of producing songs that are louder and blander, this is the first time the quality of songs is comprehensively studied and measured. Another study from the Lawrence Technological University found that between 1950 and 2016, the lyrics of most popular songs (found on the Billboard Hot 100 each year) have gotten less joyful and sadder and angrier. According to the researchers, this does not necessarily imply that music has changed or that musicians have been expressing what they want to express, but only that consumers' tastes have evolved. China-based music video app musical.ly was highly popular among American teens. This app was acquired by ByteDance, sometimes called the "Buzzfeed of China" because it is a hub for stories that go viral on the Internet. Unlike Buzzfeed, however, ByteDance does not employ young staff writers to create its contents; rather, it relies on algorithms equipped with artificial intelligence to collect and modify contents in order to optimize viewership. In 2018, musical.ly was shut down and its users were transferred to TikTok, a competing app developed by ByteDance. Both musical.ly and TikTok enable users to create short videos with popular songs as background music and with numerous special effects, including lip-synchronizing.

According to Asha Choksi, vice president of global research and insights for the educational publisher Pearson, about one in every three members of Generation Z spends at least four hours per day watching videos online. Data from the Bureau of Labor Statistics show that while people aged 15 to 24 spent more time playing video games in 2018, the time spent on computers and televisions remained virtually unchanged.

2020 Nielsen figures revealed that the viewership of children's cable television channels such as Cartoon Network or Nickelodeon continued their steady decline, which was merely decelerated due to the COVID-19 pandemic, which forced many parents and their children to stay at home. On the other hand, streaming services saw healthy growth. A 2021 survey by Deloitte found that among people born between 1997 and 2007, 26% called playing video games their favorite entertainment activity, 14% listening to music, 12% surfing the Internet, 11% browsing social media, and 10% watching a movie or TV show at home.

Dystopian fiction, such as The Hunger Games and Divergent, has been popular among teenagers. On the other hand, Generation Z continues to enjoy comfort television shows, such as The Office (2005-2013) and Friends (1994-2004).

Other aspects 

Because of the era into which they are born, members of Generation Z likely have never used items that were popular in the decades before them, such as floppy disks, cassettes, VHS tapes, typewriters, television sets with antennas, television guides, answering machines, phone books, address books, pagers, fax machines, payphones, rotary and corded phones, print encyclopedias, paper maps, and non-digital projectors. Nevertheless, despite having the reputation for "killing" many things valued by older generations, Millennials and Generation Z are nostalgically preserving Polaroid cameras, vinyl records, needlepoint, and home gardening, to name just some. According to a 2019 YouGov poll, 31% of the U.S. population is willing to pay for music on vinyl, including 26% of Generation Z. As a matter of fact, these two cohorts have given life to nostalgia as an industry in the late 2010s and early 2020s, a trend that coincides with the resurgence of some cultural phenomena of the 2000s, such the television series Friends (1994–2004), something that is well-received among young people despite its age. Indeed, many young people of the 2010s and 2020s feel nostalgic about (simpler) eras of history they never lived in due to the uncertainties and stress of modern life.

The 9/11 terrorist attacks continue to haunt Americans, including those born after 2001. Since members of Generation Z were not yet cognizant when the 9/11 attacks occurred or had not yet been born at that time, there is no generational memory of a time the United States has not been at war with the loosely defined forces of global terrorism. Even twenty years after the attacks had taken place, concerns over national security as well as personal safety remain. The economic recession of 2007-2008 is another particularly important historical event that has shaped Generation Z, due to the ways in which their childhoods may have been affected by the recession's financial stresses felt by their parents. A 2013 survey by Ameritrade found that 47% in the United States (considered here to be those between the ages of 14 and 23) were concerned about student debt, while 36% were worried about being able to afford a college education at all. This generation is faced with a growing income gap and a shrinking middle-class, which all have led to increasing stress levels in families. According to Public Relations Society of America, the Great Recession has taught Generation Z to be independent, and has led to an entrepreneurial desire, after seeing their parents and older siblings struggle in the workforce.

Psychologist Jean Twenge argued that as the typical American family has fewer children and as parents pay more attention to each of their children—for example by not allowing them to walk home from school—and to their education, the average American teenager in the mid- to late-2010s tended to be 'slow life-history strategists', meaning they delay taking part in adult activities such as drinking alcohol, having sexual intercourse, or driving. A 2014 study Generation Z Goes to College found that Generation Z students self-identify as being loyal, compassionate, thoughtful, open-minded, responsible, and determined. How they see their Generation Z peers is quite different from their own self-identity. They view their peers as competitive, spontaneous, adventuresome, and curious—all characteristics that they do not see readily in themselves.

Generation Z today is more likely than young people in the past to try out new cuisines. There is also a growing interest in vegetarian foods.

Demographics 

When Congress passed the Immigration and Nationality Act of 1965, as urged by President Lyndon B. Johnson, which abolished national quotas for immigrants and replaced it with a system that admits a fixed number of persons per year based in qualities such as skills and the need for refuge, immigration surged from elsewhere in North America (especially Canada and Mexico), Asia, Central America, and the West Indies. By the late 1990s and early 2000s, Asia and Latin America became the top sources of immigrants to the U.S.

A report by demographer William Frey of the Brookings Institution stated that in the United States, the Millennials are a bridge between the largely Caucasian pre-Millennials (Generation X and their predecessors) and the more diverse post-Millennials (Generation Z and their successors). Frey's analysis of U.S. Census data suggests that as of 2019, 50.9% of Generation Z is white, 13.8% is black, 25.0% Hispanic, and 5.3% Asian. (See figure below.) 29% of Generation Z are children of immigrants or immigrants themselves, compared to 23% of Millennials when they were at the same age. As of 2019, 13.7% of the U.S. population is foreign-born, compared to 9.7% in 1997, when the first members of Generation Z had their birth cries. Indeed, according to the Pew Research Center, in spite of the diminished flow of immigrants to the United States following the Great Recession, Generation Z is the most ethnically diverse yet seen. 52% of this generation is white. 25% is Hispanic. 14% is black, and 4% is Asian. Approximately 4% is multiracial, and this number has risen rapidly between 2000 and 2010. More specifically, the number of Americans who identify as mixed white and black has grown by 134% and those of both white and Asian extraction by 87%. For comparison, 44% of Millennials, 40% of Generation X, and 28% of the Baby Boomers identify as non-white. Research by the demographer Bill Frey suggests that at the national level, Hispanics and Asians are the fastest-growing racial minority groups in the United States while the number of Caucasians under the age of 18 has been declining since 2000. Overall, the number of births to Caucasian women in the United States dropped 7% between 2000 and 2018. Among foreign-born Caucasian women, however, the number of births increased by 1% in the same period. Although the number of births to foreign-born Hispanic women fell from 58% in 2000 to 50% in 2018, the share of births due to U.S.-born Hispanic women increased from 20% in 2000 to 24% in 2018. The number of births to foreign-born Asian women rose from 19% in 2000 to 24% in 2018 while that due to U.S.-born Asian women went from 1% in 2000 to 2% in 2018. In all, between 2000 and 2017, more births were to foreign-born than U.S.-born women.Members of Generation Z are slightly less likely to be foreign-born than Millennials; the fact that more American Latinos are born in the U.S. rather than abroad plays a role in making the first wave of Generation Z appear better educated than their predecessors. However, researchers note that this trend could be altered by changing immigration patterns and the younger members of Generation Z choosing alternate educational paths. 29% of Generation Z are children of immigrants or immigrants themselves, compared to 23% of Millennials when they were at the same age. As of 2019, 13.7% of the U.S. population is foreign-born, compared to 9.7% in 1997, when the first members of Generation Z had their birth cries.

Not only are Americans becoming more and more racially diverse, but racial minorities are also becoming more geographically dispersed than ever before, as new immigrants settle in places other than the large metropolitan areas historically populated by migrants, such as New York City, Los Angeles, and San Francisco. A majority of Generation Z live in urban areas and are less inclined to change address than their predecessors. Similar to the Millennials, roughly two thirds of Generation Z come from households of married parents. By contrast, this living arrangement was essentially the norm for Generation X and the Baby Boomers, at 73% and 85%, respectively. 

As a demographic cohort, Generation Z is smaller than the Baby Boomers or their children, the Millennials. (See population pyramid.) According to the U.S. Census Bureau, Generation Z makes up about one quarter of the U.S. population. This demographic change could have social, cultural, and political implications for the decades ahead. Generation Z are usually the children of Generation X, and sometimes Millennials. Jason Dorsey, who works for the Center of Generational Kinetics, observed that Generation Z is not an extreme version of the Millennials but is rather different, and the differences can largely be attributed to parenting. Like parents from Generation X, members of Generation Z tend to be autonomous and pessimistic. They need validation less than the Millennials and typically become financially literate at an earlier age as many of their parents bore the full brunt of the Great Recession.

Between 2009 and 2016, the number of grandparents raising their grandchildren went up 7%. This is due to a variety of factors, such as military deployment, the growing incarceration of women, drug addictions, and mental health issues. After declining for many years, the number of children in foster care increased 1% in 2013 and 3.4% in 2014. In response, states are sending more and more children who have been taken from their parents to their relatives, drawing from research showing that children tend to be better off being cared for by their own families than strangers and to save taxpayers' money.

Economic trends and outlooks

Spending and savings habits

Consumer behavior 

According to an analysis by Goldman Sachs, people from Generation Z tend to be more pragmatic about money and more entrepreneurial than the Millennials. A survey on a thousand members of Generation Z conducted by the Center for Generational Kinetics found that 77% of them were spending the money they made themselves and 38% planned to work as university students.

The development of technology has also given mobility and immediacy to Generation Z's consumption habits. They can take advantage of the on-demand economy, defined as "the economic activity created by technology companies that fulfill consumer demand via the immediate provisioning of goods and service." Generation Z tends to value utility and quality over brand name. Authenticity is critical. Having been raised by Generation X and grown up in a recession, members of Generation Z are quick to verify claims. Being heavy users of the Internet in general and social media in particular, they frequently employ these tools to learn more about a certain product or service they are interested in. Product specifications, vendor ratings, and peer reviews are all important. They tend to be skeptical and will shun firms whose actions and values are contradictory.

A survey conducted by Morning Consult in May 2019 found that among adults aged 18 to 21, 55% of females and 40% of males preferred to do their shopping in person rather than using their computers, or Amazon's Alexa. For all other adults, that number was 53%. Two out of three young adults said they went shopping for pleasure at least once per month. An A.T. Kearney survey sampling 1,500 consumers from four demographic cohorts found that the people aged 14 to 24 tended to purchase more products in the health and wellness category than any other groups and were more willing than their elders to halt a purchase if they disliked the customer service. 81% said they preferred brick-and-mortar stores and 73% said they would like to discover new products in such a store. 67% said they preferred products whose ingredients they can understand and 65% preferred simple packaging. 58% told the pollsters manually browsing products helps them disconnect from the digital world, a sort of "retail therapy." 22% said social media is a source of stress for them, a number that is higher than that for the Millennials (18%), Generation X (13%), and the Baby Boomers (8%). In addition, while more than half said they sought environmentally friendly products, only 38% were willing to pay extra for them. Young American consumers of this cohort are less likely to pay a premium for what they want compared to their counterparts from emerging economies.

While majorities might signal their support for certain ideals such as "environmental consciousness" to pollsters, actual purchases do not reflect their stated views, as can be seen from their high demand for cheap but not durable clothing ("fast fashion"), or preference for rapid delivery. Nor are they willing to shun firms whose owners have "conservative" values, such as Chick-fil-A, which remains one of the most popular fast-food restaurant chains in the United States among teenagers.

Nostalgia is a major theme of the behavior of consumers from Generation Z. For example, 2000s vintage electronics and fashion are back in vogue by the early 2020s.

Financial security 

According to the USA Today, 69% of Generation Z turn to their parents for financial advice compared to 52% of younger Millennials. Friends followed at a distant second place with 24% and 19%, respectively. Unlike their predecessors, members of Generation Z are highly averse to debts and many are already saving for retirement. Their money-saving habits are reminiscent of those who came of age during the Great Depression. According to Morning Consult, four in ten of those aged 18 to 22 incur no debt at all. However, because they are spending so much time online playing video games, they make many in-game purchases that add up over time without realizing how much money they are actually spending. In any case, in the second quarter of 2019, the number of people from Generation Z carrying a credit card balance increased by 41% compared to that of 2018 (from 5,483,000 to 7,746,000), as the first wave of this demographic cohort became old enough to take out a mortgage, a loan, or to have credit-card debt, according to TransUnion. In 2019, credit cards became the most common form of debt for Generation Z, overtaking auto loans. This is despite the fact that they grew up during the Great Recession. The financial industry expects continued growth in credit activity by Generation Z, whose rate of credit delinquency is comparable to those of the Millennials and Generation X. According to a 2019 report from the financial firm Northwestern Mutual, student loans were the top source of debt for Generation Z, at 25%. For comparison, mortgages were the top source of debt for the Baby Boomers (28%) and Generation X (30%); for the Millennials, it was credit card bills (25%).

In a study conducted in 2015 the Center for Generational Kinetics found that American members of Generation Z, defined here as those born 1996 and onward, are less optimistic about the state of the US economy than their immediate predecessors, the Millennials. However, Generation Z (58%) is more likely to say they expect to be more successful than their parents were than younger Millennials (52%). Whereas 13% of younger Millennials said they expected to be less successful than their parents, only 10% of Generation Z said the same. A total of 58% of Generation Z said they had not experienced a quarter-life crisis, compared with 46% of younger Millennials. Americans aged 15 to 21 expect to be financially independent in their early twenties while their parents generally expect them to become so by their mid-twenties. By contrast, about one out of five Millennials expect to still be dependent on their parents beyond the age of 30. While the Millennials tend to prefer flexibility, Generation Z is more interested in certainty and stability. Whereas 23% of Millennials would leave a job if they thought they were not appreciated, only 15% of Generation Z would do the same, according to a Deloitte survey. According to the World Economic Forum (WEF), 77% of Generation Z expects to work harder than previous generations.

Tourism and housing markets 
Research by the online travel booking company Booking.com reveals that 54% of Generation Z considered environmental impact of their travels to be an important factor, 56% said they would like to stay in environmentally friendly lodging, and 60% were interested in greener modes of transport once they reached their destinations. Meanwhile, the online booking firm Expedia Group found that cost was crucial for 82% of tourists from Generation Z. Therefore, the desire of Generation Z to travel and see the world comes into conflict with what they can afford and their wish to limit their environmental impact.

With regards to the housing market, they typically look for properties with amenities that are comparable to what they experienced as university students. A 2019 Bank of America survey found that over half of people aged 18 to 23 were already saving for a home, with 59% saying they planned to do so within five years. More than one in two members of Generation Z said the top reason why they wanted to own a home was to start a family. For comparison, this number was 40% for the Millennials, 17% for Generation X, and 10% for the Baby Boomers. The survey also found that if they were given $5,000, most members of Generation Z would rather save that money for a down payment rather than spending it on a dream wedding, shopping, or a vacation. A majority of Generation Z was willing to take a second job, attend a less costly university, or move back to their parents' place in order to save money. They are also quite willing to live with people they did not know previously in order to save on rent in large metropolitan areas. According to the personal finance company Credit Karma, 43% of Generation Z said they had had strangers as roommates and 30% said they were willing to move in with roommates they did not know. House cleaning, a potential point of friction, is handled by maids. Nationwide, about one in four Americans have lived with someone they had no prior relationship with.

Data from TransUnion reveals that as the Millennials enter the housing market in large numbers, taking out more mortgages in 2018 than any other living generation, Generation Z's number of new mortgages is also increasing dramatically, from 150,000 in the second quarter of 2018 to 319,000 in the second quarter of 2019, an increase of 112%. Generation Z consumers took out 41% more auto loans in the second quarter of 2019 than in the same period the previous year. While one out of five Millennial renters said they expected to continue to do so indefinitely, according to a survey by Apartment List, a Freddie Mac study found that 86% of Generation Z desired to own a home by the age of 30. Freddie Mac did note, however, that Generation Z understood the challenges of home prices, making down payments, and student loan debts. According to the real-estate company realtor.com, the first wave of Generation Z was buying homes at about the same rate as their grandparents the Silent Generation in late 2019, when they owned about 2% of the housing market. Judging by the amounts of mortgages, the top housing markets tend to have strong local economies and low cost of living. They also tend to be university towns; many young people prefer to live where they studied. In general, Generation Z appears most interested in owning a home in the Midwest and the South. Broadly speaking, while the Millennials are migrating North, Generation Z is moving South. The median price of a home purchased by Generation Z in 2019 was $160,600 and increasing, but remains lower than that of the Millennials, $256,500.

Employment expectations and prospects 

Quantitative historian Peter Turchin observed that demand for labor in the United States had been stagnant since 2000 and would likely continue to 2020 as the nation went through the negative part of the Kondratiev wave. (See right.) Moreover, the share of people in their 20s continued to grow till the end of the 2010s according to projections by the U.S. Census Bureau, meaning the youth bulge would likely not fade away before the 2020s. As such the gap between the supply and demand in the labor market would likely not fall before then, and falling or stagnant wages generate sociopolitical stress.

Current trends suggest that developments in artificial intelligence and robotics will not result in mass unemployment but can actually create high-skilled jobs. However, in order to take advantage of this situation, one needs a culture and an education system that promote lifelong learning. Honing skills that machines have not yet mastered, such as teamwork, will be crucial. Generation Z's top career choices—becoming business people, doctors, engineers, artists, and IT workers—are not that different from generations past. For them, the most important qualities in a job are income, fulfillment, work-life balance, and job security. Most prefer to work for a medium or large company rather than a startup or a government agency.

A Harvard Business Review article from 2015 stated that about 70% of Generation Z was self-employed, e.g. selling things online, and only 12% had "traditional" teen jobs, such as waiting tables. Heavy use of the Internet has made self-employment much easier than it was in the past. A Morgan Stanley report, called the Blue Paper, projected that the Millennials and Generation Z have been responsible in a surge in labor participation in the U.S., and that while the U.S. labor force expands, that of other G10 countries will contract. This development alleviates concerns over America's aging population which jeopardizes the solvency of various welfare programs. As of 2019, Millennials and Generation Z account for 38% of the U.S. workforce; that number will rise to 58% in the incoming decade. Whenever they find themselves short on skills, Generation Z will pick up what they need using the Internet. While there is agreement across generations that it is very important for employees to learn new skills, Millennials and Generation Z are overwhelmingly more likely than Baby Boomers to think that it is the job of employees to train themselves. Baby Boomers tend to think it is the employer's responsibility. Moreover, Millennials and Generation Z (74%) tend to have more colleagues working remotely for a significant portion of their time compared to the Baby Boomers (58%).

According to the Bureau of Labor Statistics, the occupations with the fastest projected growth rate between 2018 and 2028 are solar cell and wind turbine technicians, healthcare and medical aides, cyber security experts, statisticians, speech-language pathologists, genetic counselors, mathematicians, operations research analysts, software engineers, forest fire inspectors and prevention specialists, post-secondary health instructors, and phlebotomists. Their projected growth rates are between 23% (medical assistants) and 63% (solar cell installers); their annual median pays range between roughly US$24,000 (personal care aides) to over US$108,000 (physician assistants). Occupations with the highest projected numbers of jobs added between 2018 and 2028 are healthcare and personal aides, nurses, restaurant workers (including cooks and waiters), software developers, janitors and cleaners, medical assistants, construction workers, freight laborers, marketing researchers and analysts, management analysts, landscapers and groundskeepers, financial managers, tractor and truck drivers, and medical secretaries. The total numbers of jobs added ranges from 881,000 (personal care aides) to 96,400 (medical secretaries). Annual median pays range from over US$24,000 (fast-food workers) to about US$128,000 (financial managers).

2019 data from the U.S. government reveals that there are over half a million vacant manufacturing jobs in the country, a record high, thanks to an increasing number of Baby Boomers entering retirement. However, in order to attract new workers to overcome this "Silver Tsunami," manufacturers need to debunk a number of misconceptions about their industries. For example, the American public tends to underestimate the salaries of manufacturing workers. Nevertheless, almost one in three members of Generation Z said a career in manufacturing was recommended to them, which is higher than 18% of the general public and 13% of Millennials, and over one quarter said they would consider a job in that sector. In addition, the number of people doubting the viability of American manufacturing has declined to 54% in 2019, compared to 70% in 2018, the L2L Manufacturing Index measured. After the Great Recession, the number of U.S. manufacturing jobs reached a minimum of 11.5 million in February 2010. It rose to 12.8 million in September 2019. It was 14 million in March 2007. As of 2019, manufacturing industries made up 12% of the U.S. economy, which is increasingly reliant on service industries, as is the case for other advanced economies around the world. Nevertheless, twenty-first-century manufacturing is increasingly sophisticated, using advanced robotics, 3D printing, cloud computing, among other modern technologies, and technologically savvy employees are precisely what employers need. Four-year university degrees are unnecessary; technical or vocational training, or perhaps apprenticeship would do. America's shortage of skilled tradespeople, such as plumbers—whose incomes are in six digits—continues in early 2021 despite the COVID-19 pandemic and despite rising salaries and potential employers offering to pay their recruits during training.

Due to declining interest in higher education and a tight labor market, in the early 2020s, young Americans could expect to be hired right after graduating high school.

Education 
A 2022 poll by YPulse found that the top five sets of skills Millennials and Generation Z wished they had learned at school were managing mental health, self-defense, survival skills and basic first aid, cooking, and personal finance. 

The COVID-19 pandemic has badly disrupted the American education system. In the early 2020s, different school districts report significant shortages of teachers, many of whom have left their positions or the profession itself due to low pay, stressful work environments, the lack of respect for them, and the hostility towards them from some politicians and parents. This problem is not new but it mostly affects students in economically deprived areas. Well-endowed suburban schools do not have this problem. Public schools across the United States also presently face falling enrollment due to population decline and defections to private schools and home schooling. As a result, their funding has also fallen.

Many students are finding themselves in the midst of an escalating cultural conflict in which political activists are demanding that books dealing with sensitive topics relating to race and sexuality and those that include coarse language and explicit violence be removed from school libraries. The teaching of race and sexuality also proven to be politically controversial in recent years, so much so that following the COVID-19 pandemic, support for parents' rights in deciding their children's educational contents and school choice, or the redirecting of tax money via vouchers to fund private schools chosen by the parents, has grown considerably.

Despite the general consensus that mathematics education in the United States is mediocre, as indicated by international test scores in the late 2010s, there is strong partisan disagreement over how to address this issue because people are divided between the more traditional teacher-led approach and the student-led or inquiry-based method. An emphasis on rote memorization and speed gives as many as one in three students age five and up mathematical anxiety. Meanwhile, an increasing number of parents opted to send their children to enrichment and accelerated learning after-school or summer programs in the subject. However, many school officials turned their backs on these programs, believing that their primary beneficiaries are affluent white and Asian families, prompting parents to pick private institutions or math circles. Some public schools serving low-income neighborhoods even denied the existence of mathematically gifted students. By the mid-2010s, however, some public schools have begun offering enrichment programs to their students.

Nevertheless, American students ranked above the OECD average in science and computer literacy, as of 2021.

Pre-school and kindergarten 
In 2018, the American Academy of Pediatrics released a policy statement summarizing progress on developmental and neurological research on unstructured time spent by children, colloquially 'play', and noting the importance of play time for social, cognitive, and language skills development. This is because to many educators and parents, play has come to be seen as outdated and irrelevant. In fact, between 1981 and 1997, time spent by children on unstructured activities dropped by 25% due to increased amounts of time spent on structured activities. Unstructured time tended to be spent on screens at the expense of active play. The statement encourages parents and children to spend more time on "playful learning," which reinforces the intrinsic motivation to learn and discover and strengthens the bond between children and their parents and other caregivers. It also helps children handle stress and prevents "toxic stress," something that hampers development. Dr. Michael Yogman, lead author of the statement, noted that play does not necessarily have to involve fancy toys; common household items would do as well. Moreover, parents reading to children also counts as play, because it encourages children to use their imaginations.

Primary 
Although the Common Core standards eliminated the requirement that public elementary schools teach cursive writing in 2010, lawmakers from many states, including Illinois, Ohio, and Texas, have introduced legislation to teach it in theirs in 2019. Some studies point to the benefits of handwriting—print or cursive—for the development of cognitive and motor skills as well as memory and comprehension. For example, one 2012 neuroscience study suggests that handwriting "may facilitate reading acquisition in young children." Cursive writing has been used to help students with learning disabilities, such as dyslexia, a disorder that makes it difficult to interpret words, letters, and other symbols. Unfortunately, lawmakers often cite them out of context, conflating handwriting in general with cursive handwriting. In any case, some 80% of historical records and documents of the United States, such as the correspondence of Abraham Lincoln, was written by hand in cursive, and students today tend to be unable to read them. Indeed, historian and former Harvard University president Drew Gilpin Faust noted that the Generation Z never learned to read and write cursive. Historically, cursive writing was regarded as a mandatory, almost military, exercise. But today, it is thought of as an art form by those who pursue it, both adults and children.

Secondary 
While courses on home economics, also known as family and consumer sciences (FCS), were commonplace in the United States during the twentieth century, they were on the decline in the early twenty-first for a variety of reasons, ranging from a shortage of qualified teachers to funding cuts. This is despite attempts to revise them for life in the contemporary era. FCS courses in the past taught the basics of cooking and housework but now also teach nutrition, community gardening, composting, personal finance, among other topics; they are intended to fill in the gaps of knowledge that parents in the olden days taught their children but in many cases can no longer do because both parents are working. In 2012, there were only 3.5 million students enrolled in FCS courses in secondary schools, a drop of 38% from the previous decade.

A survey by the Pew Research Center found that one in three girls aged 13 to 17 felt excited every day or almost every day about something they learned at school. For boys of the same age group, this number is just above one in five. Since the early 2010s, a number of U.S. states have taken steps to strengthen teacher education. Ohio, Tennessee, and Texas had the top programs in 2014. Meanwhile, Rhode Island, which previously had the nation's lowest bar on who can train to become a school teacher, has been admitting education students with higher and higher average SAT, ACT, and GRE scores. The state aims to accept only those with standardized test scores in the top third of the national distribution by 2020, which would put it in the ranks of education superpowers such as Finland and Singapore. In Finland, studying to become a teacher is as tough and prestigious as studying to become a medical doctor or a lawyer.During the 2000s and 2010s, whereas the Asian polities (especially China, Hong Kong, South Korea, and Singapore) actively sought out gifted students and steered them towards competitive programs, Europe and the United States emphasized inclusion and focused on helping struggling students. Developmental cognitive psychologist David Geary observed that Western educators remained "resistant" to the possibility that even the most talented of schoolchildren needed encouragement and support. In addition, even though it is commonly believed that past a certain IQ benchmark (typically 120), practice becomes much more important than cognitive abilities in mastering new knowledge, recently published research papers based on longitudinal studies, such as the Study of Mathematically Precocious Youth (SMPY) and the Duke University Talent Identification Program, suggest otherwise.
According to the 2018 National Assessment of Educational Progress, 73% of American eighth and twelfth graders had deficient writing skills. There have been numerous reports in the 2010s on how U.S. students were falling behind their international counterparts in the STEM subjects, especially those from (East) Asia. For example, American schoolchildren put up a mediocre performance on the OECD-sponsored Program for International Student Assessment (PISA), administered every three years to fifteen-year-old students around the world on reading comprehension, mathematics, and science, falling in the middle of the pack of some 71 countries and territories that participated in 2015. This is a source of concern for some because academically gifted students in STEM can have an inordinately positive impact on the national economy. In addition, while American students are less focused on STEM, students from China and India are not only outperforming them but are also coming to the United States in large numbers for higher education. 

Although passing a high school physics course is linked to graduating from college with a STEM degree, something that is increasingly popular among Generation Z, just under two-fifths of high school graduates did in 2013, according to the American Institute of Physics. With few high school students taking physics, even fewer will study the subject in college and be able to teach it, a vicious cycle. The shortage of high school physics teachers is even more acute than that of mathematics or chemistry teachers.Many American public schools suffer from inadequate or dated facilities. Some schools even leak when it rains. It is 2017 report on American infrastructure, the American Society of Civil Engineers (ASCE) gave public schools a score of D+. In 2013, less than a third of American public schools have access to broadband Internet service, according to the non-profit EducationSuperHighway. By 2019, however, that number reached 99%. This has increased the frequency of digital learning.

Sex education has been reformed. While traditional lessons involving bananas and condoms remain common, newer approaches that emphasize financial responsibility and character development have been implemented. These reforms play a role in the significant drop in teenage birthrates.

By the mid-2010s, over four-fifths of American high school students graduate on time and over 70% enroll in college right after graduation. However, nationally, only one-quarter of American high school seniors are able to do grade-level math and only 37% are proficient in reading, yet about half graduate from high school as A students, prompting concerns of grade inflation. In addition, while 93% of middle school students said they want to attend college, only 26% go on to do so and graduate within six years. Critics argue that American high schools are not giving students they need for their future lives and careers. On top of the high costs of collegiate education, the vacancy of potentially millions of skilled jobs that do not require a university degree is making lawmakers reconsider their stance on tertiary education.

Post-secondary 

Generation Z is revolutionizing the educational system in many aspects. Thanks in part to a rise in the popularity of entrepreneurship and advancements in technology, high schools and colleges across the globe are including entrepreneurship in their curriculum.

Generation Z is more likely to search for the information they need on the Internet rather than going through a book and are accustomed to learning by watching videos.

Technical, trades, and vocational schools 
According to the WEF, over one in five members of Generation Z are interested in attending a trade or technical school instead of a college or university. In the United States today, high school students are generally encouraged to attend college or university after graduation while the options of technical school and vocational training are often neglected. Historically, high schools separated students on career tracks, with programs aimed at students bound for higher education and those bound for the workforce. Students with learning disabilities or behavioral issues were often directed towards vocational or technical schools. All this changed in the late 1980s and early 1990s thanks to a major effort in the large cities to provide more abstract academic education to everybody. The mission of high schools became preparing students for college, referred to as "high school to Harvard." However, this program faltered in the 2010s, as institutions of higher education came under heightened skepticism due to high costs and disappointing results. People became increasingly concerned about debts and deficits. No longer were promises of educating "citizens of the world" or estimates of economic impact coming from abstruse calculations sufficient. Colleges and universities found it necessary to prove their worth by clarifying how much money from which industry and company-funded research, and how much it would cost to attend.

According to the Department of Education, people with technical or vocational training are slightly more likely to be employed than those with a bachelor's degree and significantly more likely to be employed in their fields of specialty. The United States currently suffers from a shortage of skilled tradespeople. If nothing is done, this problem will get worse as aging workers retire and the market tightens due to falling unemployment rates. Economists argue that raising wages could incentivize more young people to pursue these careers. Many manufacturers are partnering with community colleges to create apprenticeship and training programs. However, they still have an image problem as people perceive manufacturing jobs as unstable, given the mass layoffs during the Great Recession of 2007–8.

Career counselors are in extremely high demand, being called for not just appointments but also career fairs and orientation sessions for new students. Whereas 75% of Americans have never had someone pointing out the options of a trade or vocational school to them, this number is only 59% for Generation Z, according to the L2L Manufacturing Index. Members of Generation Z have witnessed their elders the Millennials accumulating large amounts of debts in order to pay for expensive university tuition fees and are consequently more open to alternative educational routes and career options. According to the 2018 CNBC All-American Economic Survey, only 40% of Americans believed that the financial cost of a four-year university degree is justified, down from 44% five years before. Moreover, only 50% believed a four-year program is the best kind of training, down from 60%, and the number of people who saw value in a two-year program jumped to 26% from 18%. These findings are consistent with other reports.

College preparation 
High school students bound for university in the United States often take standardized exams such as the SAT. Between 2005 and 2015, when the test was revised, there was a clear decline in test scores, despite various attempts at educational reforms. Improvements in elementary-school grades amounted to nothing in high school. Reasons for this include poverty, urban decay, low parental educational attainment, and weak linguistic skills. Direct score comparisons between different U.S. states and the District of Columbia is difficult, however, because the lower the participation, the higher the scores, and different states had different numbers of test takers. Cyndie Schmeiser of the College Board, which administers the SAT, told The Washington Post that between 2010 and 2015, only 42% of students scored at least 1550, considered the benchmark for college readiness. In 2016, a new grading scheme was introduced. While the old test had a maximum score of 2400 and had three sections, mathematics, reading, and writing, the new one has a maximum score of 1600 and only two sections, mathematics and "evidence-based reading and writing." Final scores were re-scaled, such that the combined mathematics and verbal score on the old SAT do not correspond to the total score from the new one. Thus, for example, a new 1400 corresponds to an old 1340. In general, new scores are inflated between 60 and 80 points. This does not mean the test has become easier or that the students have become better prepared, however. In general, scores are positively correlated with family income and privately educated students tend to do better. The College Board announced a partnership with the non-profit organization Khan Academy to offer free test-preparation materials to help level the playing field for students from low-income families.

Colleges and universities 

The Pew Research Center found that 59% of Generation Z aged 20 to 22 were enrolled in college in 2019, compared to 53% of Millennials in 2002. The number of young people attending university was 44% in 1986. Nevertheless, undergraduate enrollment has been in decline for some time. Due to population aging, the number of college-aged people in the United States will fall after 2025, making it easier for people born in the late 2000s and after to get admitted. Demand for the top 100 American institutions, however, will likely remain largely unchanged.

Overall, the 2010s have proven to be a turbulent period for higher education in the United States, as small private colleges from across the country face deep financial trouble due to higher tuition discounts in order to attract students at a time of expensive higher education costs, tougher regulation, and the fact that the college-aged population has declined. Institutions address these challenges by dropping programs with low student interest, including many in the liberal arts and the humanities, like gender studies and critical race theory, and creating majors for emerging fields, such as artificial intelligence, or professional programs, such as law enforcement, and investing in online learning programs. As of 2019, some 800 schools faced the prospects of either closure or consolidation with existing ones. Public colleges and university systems are also consolidating in order to cut costs. Meanwhile, the for-profit sector has been nose-diving due to increased regulatory oversight and poor outcomes. Economists Clayton Christensen and Michael Horn independently predicted in 2019 that large numbers of the over 4,000 colleges and universities in the U.S. will permanently close within 15 to 20 years. Rising administrative costs, sluggish middle-class wages, demographic decline (especially in the Northeast and Midwest), new forms of learning, stronger competition from better endowed universities, and higher demands of technical training undermine the financial viability of many schools. "It's going to be brutal across American higher education," Horn told CBS News. A 2019 analysis by Moody's Investor Services estimated that about 20% of all small private liberal arts colleges in the United States were in serious financial trouble.

Such were the trends before 2020, and the arrival of SARS-CoV-2 in the United States in 2020 merely accelerated the process. The novel pneumonia virus not only wrought havoc on the nation but also caused a severe economic downturn. Consequently, families chose to either delay or avoid sending their children to institutions of higher education altogether. Worse still, colleges and universities have become dependent on foreign students for revenue because they pay full tuition fees and the international restrictions imposed to alleviate the spread of the pandemic mean that this stream of revenue will shrink substantially. On top of that, many schools face lawsuits by students who believed they had received substandard online services in the wake of the pandemic. Numerous institutions, including elite ones, have suspended graduate programs in the humanities and liberal arts due to low student interest and dim employment prospects.

Historically, university students were more likely to be male than female. This trend continued into the very early twenty-first century, but by the late 2010s, the situation has reversed. Women are now more likely to enroll in university than men. By the end of the 2020–21 academic year, 59.5% of university students were women. Compared to five years ago, the number of students enrolled in American institutions of higher education has declined by about 1.5 million, with men being responsible for 71% of the decline. This growing sex gap has been growing for four decades in the United States in parallel with other countries of middle to high income. In addition, among those who attend college or university, women are more likely then men to graduate with a degree within six years. There is little support for initiatives to encourage and assist men to attend college due to identity politics, which paints men, especially white men, as a privileged group. The COVID-19 pandemic accelerated the trend of declining interest in higher education among young men. On the other hand, the number of women's colleges continues to fall, following a decades-long trend.

As Generation Z enters high school, and they start preparing for college, a primary concern is paying for a college education without acquiring debt. Students report working hard in high school in hopes of earning scholarships and the hope that parents will pay the college costs not covered by scholarships. As of 2019, the total college debt has exceeded $1.5 trillion, and two out of three college graduates are saddled with debt. The average borrower owes $37,000, up $10,000 from ten years before. A 2019 survey by TD Ameritrade found that over 30% of Generation Z (and 18% of Millennials) said they have considered taking a gap year between high school and college. In order to address the challenges of expensive tuition and student debt, many colleges have diversified their revenue, especially by changing enrollment, recruitment, and retention, and introduced further tuition discounts. Between the academic years 2007-8 and 2018–9, tuition discounts increased significantly. Almost nine in every ten first-time full-time freshmen received some kind of financial aid in the academic year 2017–8.

Students also report interest in Reserve Officers' Training Corps (ROTC) programs as a means of covering college costs. Indeed, college subsidies are one of the most attractive things about signing up for military service. Another enticement is signing bonuses, whose amounts vary according to specialty.

However, in 2010, quantitative historian Peter Turchin noted that the United States was overproducing university graduates—he termed this elite overproduction—in the 2000s and predicted, using historical trends, that this would be one of the causes of political instability in the 2020s, alongside income inequality, stagnating or declining real wages, growing public debt. According to Turchin, intensifying competition among graduates, whose numbers were larger than what the economy could absorb, leads to political polarization, social fragmentation, and even violence as many become disgruntled with their dim prospects despite having attained a high level of education. He warned that the turbulent 1960s and 1970s could return, as having a massive young population with university degrees was one of the key reasons for the instability of the past.

Members of Generation Z are anxious to pick majors that teach them marketable skills. According to the World Economic Forum (WEF), some 88% consider job preparation to be the point of college. 39% are aiming for a career in medicine or healthcare, 20% in the natural sciences, 18% in biology or biotechnology, and 17% in business. A 2018 Gallup poll on over 32,000 university students randomly selected from 43 schools from across the United States found that just over half (53%) of them thought their chosen major would lead to gainful employment. STEM students expressed the highest confidence (62%) while those in the liberal arts were the least confident (40%). Just over one in three thought they would learn the skills and knowledge needed to become successful in the workplace. Because jobs (that matched what one studied) were so difficult to find in the few years following the Great Recession, the value of getting a liberal arts degree and studying the humanities at university came into question, their ability to develop a well-rounded and broad-minded individual notwithstanding. While the number of students majoring in the humanities has fallen significantly, those in science, technology, engineering, and mathematics, or STEM, have risen sharply. Furthermore, those who majored in the humanities and the liberal arts in the 2010s were most likely to regret having done so, whereas those in STEM, especially computer science and engineering, were the least likely. Indeed, STEM workers tend to earn more than their non-STEM counterparts; the difference widens after the bachelor's degree. 54% of people in the life sciences have an advanced degree, making this group the most educated overall among STEM workers. While about half of STEM graduates work in non-STEM jobs, people with collegiate STEM training still tend to earn more, regardless of whether or not their job is STEM-related or not.

About a quarter of American university students failed to graduate within six years in the late 2010s and those who did faced diminishing wage premiums.

Ever since it was introduced in the 1960s, affirmative action has been a controversial topic in the United States. In January 2022, the U.S. Supreme Court agreed to hear two legal challenges to race-based admissions at the University of North Carolina and Harvard University. The Court's decision will impact the demographics of students at American institutions of higher learning.

Health issues

General 
A 2020 study of data from 1999 to 2015 suggests that children living with married parents tended to have lower rates of early-life mortality than those living with unmarried or single parents and non-parents.

Puberty 
In both Europe and the United States, the average age of the onset of puberty was around 13 in the early twenty-first century, down from about 16 a hundred years earlier. Early puberty is associated with a variety of mental health issues—such as anxiety and depression, as people at this age tend to strongly desire conformity with their peers—,early sexual activity, substance abuse, tobacco smoking, eating disorders, and disruptive behavioral disorders. To compound matters, factors known for prompting mental health problems are themselves linked to early pubertal onset; these are early childhood stress, absent fathers, domestic conflict, and low socioeconomic status. Possible causes of early puberty could be positive, namely improved nutrition, or negative, such as obesity and stress.

In the United States, African girls on average enter puberty first, followed by those of Hispanic, European, and Asian extraction, in that order. But African-American girls are less likely to face the negative effects of puberty than their counterparts of European descent.

A 2019 meta-analysis and review of the research literature from all inhabited continents found that between 1977 and 2013, the age of pubertal onset among girls has fallen by an average of almost three months per decade, but with significant regional variations, ranging from 10.1 to 13.2 years in Africa to 8.8 to 10.3 years in the United States. This investigation relies on measurements of thelarche (initiation of breast tissue development) using the Tanner scale rather than self-reported menarche (first menstruation) and MRI brain scans for signs of the hypothalamic-pituitary-gonadal axis being reactivated. Furthermore, there is evidence that sexual maturity and psychosocial maturity no longer coincide; twenty-first-century youths appear to be reaching the former before the latter. Neither adolescents nor societies are prepared for this mismatch.

Physical 
Data from the NCES showed that in the academic year 2018–19, 15% of students receiving special education under the Individuals with Disabilities Education Act was suffering from "other health impairments"—such as asthma, diabetes, epilepsy, heart problems, hemophilia, lead poisoning, leukemia, nephritis, rheumatic fever, sickle cell anemia, and tuberculosis.

Vision 

A 2015 study found that the frequency of nearsightedness has doubled in the United Kingdom within the last 50 years. Ophthalmologist Steve Schallhorn, chairman of the Optical Express International Medical Advisory Board, noted that research have pointed to a link between the regular use of handheld electronic devices and eyestrain. The American Optometric Association sounded the alarm on a similar vein. According to a spokeswoman, digital eyestrain, or computer vision syndrome, is "rampant, especially as we move toward smaller devices and the prominence of devices increase in our everyday lives." Symptoms include dry and irritated eyes, fatigue, eye strain, blurry vision, difficulty focusing, headaches. However, the syndrome does not cause vision loss or any other permanent damage. In order to alleviate or prevent eyestrain, the Vision Council recommends that people limit screen time, take frequent breaks, adjust screen brightness, change the background from bright colors to gray, increase text sizes, and blinking more often. Parents should not only limit their children's screen time but should also lead by example.

Allergies 
While food allergies have been observed by doctors since ancient times and virtually all foods can be allergens, research by the Mayo Clinic in Minnesota found they are becoming increasingly common since the early 2000s. Today, one in twelve American children has a food allergy, with peanut allergy being the most prevalent type. Nut allergies, in general, have quadrupled and shellfish allergies have increased 40% between 2004 and 2019. In all, about 36% of American children have some kind of allergy. By comparison, this number among the Amish in Indiana is 7%. Allergies have also risen ominously in other Western countries. In general, the better developed the country, the higher the rates of allergies. Reasons for this remain poorly understood. One possible explanation, supported by the National Institute of Allergy and Infectious Diseases, is that parents keep their children "too clean for their own good." They recommend exposing newborn babies to a variety of potentially allergenic foods, such as peanut butter, before they reach the age of six months. According to this "hygiene hypothesis," such exposures give the infant's immune system some exercise, making it less likely to overreact. Evidence for this includes the fact that children living on a farm are consistently less likely to be allergic than their counterparts who are raised in the city, and that children born in a developed country to parents who immigrated from developing nations are more likely to be allergic than their parents are.

Mental 
A survey conducted the Fall of 2018 by the American Psychological Association revealed that Generation Z had the weakest mental health of any living generation; some 91% of this demographic cohort reported physical or emotion symptoms associated with stress. Some 54% of workers under the age of 23 said they felt stressed within the last month. This number for the Millennials was 40%. The national average was 34%. Experts have not reached a consensus on what might be the cause of this spike in mental health issues. Some suggest it is because of the current state of the world while others argue it is due to increased willingness to discuss such topics. Perhaps both are at play. Across the United States, university students are besieging the offices of health service workers seeking mental health support. According to The Economist, while teenagers from wealthier households are less likely to have behavioral problems, mental health is an issue that affects every teen regardless of family background. Moreover, the number of university students reporting mental health issues has been rising since the 1950s, if not earlier. Today, one in five American adults suffer from a mental condition, according to the National Institute of Mental Health.

Anxiety, depression, and suicidal ideation 
A research paper published in the Journal of the American Medical Association (JAMA) in June 2019 found a marked increase in suicide rates among adolescents. In 2017, the suicide rate for people aged 15 to 19 was 11.8 per 100,000, the highest point since 2000, when it was 8 per 100,000. In 2017, 6,241 Americans aged 15 to 19 committed suicide, of whom 5,016 were male and 1,225 were female. A flaw in this study is that cause-of-death reports may occasionally be inaccurate. The Center for Disease Control and Prevention (CDC) reported a 30% increase in suicide across all age groups in the United States between 2000 and 2016. There could be a variety of reasons for this. The authors of the JAMA paper suggest an increased willingness by families and coroners to label a death as a result of suicide, depression or opioid usage. Nadine Kaslow, a psychiatrist and behavioral scientist at the Emory University School of Medicine, who was not involved in the paper, pointed to the weakening of familial and other social bonds and the heavy use of modern communications technology, which exposes people to the risk of cyber-bullying. She noted that other studies have shown higher suicide rates, too, especially among adolescents and young adults.

The number of American teenagers who suffered from the classic symptoms of depression rose 33% between 2010 and 2015. During the same period, the number of those aged 13 to 21 who committed suicide jumped 31% between 2010 and 2015. Psychologist Jean Twenge and her colleagues found that this growth of mental health issues was not divided along the lines of socioeconomic class, race/ethnicity, or geographical location. Rather, it was associated with spending more time in front of a screen. In general, suicide risk factors—depression, contemplating, planning, and attempting suicide—increase significantly if the subject spends more than two to three hours online. Especially, those who spent five or more hours had their suicide risk factors increase 71%. It is not clear, however, whether depression causes a teenager to spend more time online or the other way around. At the same time, teens who spent more time online were more likely to not have enough sleep, a major predictor of depression. Many teenagers told researchers they used a smartphone or a tablet right before bed, kept the device close, and used it as an alarm clock. But the blue light emitted by these devices, texting, and social networking are known for perturbing sleep. Besides mental problems like depression and anxiety, sleep deprivation is also linked to reduced performance in school and obesity. Parents can address the problem of sleep deprivation simply by imposing limits on screen time and buying simple alarm clocks.

Sleep deprivation 
Research from the American Academy of Pediatrics analyzing responses from the parents of caregivers of 49,050 children aged six to seventeen in the combined 2016-2017 National Survey of Children's Health revealed that only 47.6% of American children slept for nine hours on most days, meaning a significant number was sleep deprived. Compared with children who did not get enough sleep most nights, those who did were 44% more likely to be curious about new things, 33% more likely to finish their homework, 28% more likely to care about their academic performance, and 14% more likely to finish the tasks they started. The researchers identified the risk factors associated with sleep deprivation among children to be the low educational attainment of parents or caregivers, being from families living below the federal poverty line, higher digital media usage, more negative childhood experiences, and mental illnesses.

Cognitive abilities 
According to the National Center for Education Statistics (NCES), between the academic years 2011–12 and 2018–19, the number of students aged three to twenty-one receiving special education under the Individuals with Disabilities Education Act (IDEA) increased from 6.4 million to 7.1 million. Of these, one in three suffered from a specific learning disability, such as having more difficulty than usual with reading or understanding mathematics. Among students enrolled in public schools in that age group, the share receiving special education rose from 13% to 14% during the same time period. Amerindians (18%) and blacks (16%) were the most likely to receive special education while Pacific Islanders (11%) and Asians (7%) were the least likely. After specific learning disabilities, the most common types of learning disorders included speech and language impairment (19%), autism (11%), and developmental delay (7%).

In a 2018 paper, cognitive scientists James R. Flynn and Michael Shayer presented evidence that from the 1990s until the 2010s, the observed gains in IQ during the twentieth century—commonly known as the Flynn effect—had either stagnated (as in the case of Australia, France, and the Netherlands), became mixed (in the German-speaking nations), or reversed (in the Nordic countries and the United Kingdom). This, however, was not the case in South Korea or the United States, as the U.S. continued its historic march towards higher IQ, a rate of 0.38 per decade, at least up until 2014 while South Korea saw its IQ scores growing at twice the average U.S. rate.

Yet while U.S. IQ scores continued to increase, creativity scores, as measured by the Torrance Test of Creative Thinking, were in decline between the 1990s and late 2000s. Educational psychologist Kyung Hee Kim reached this conclusion after analyzing data samples of kindergartens to high-school students and adults in 1974, 1984, 1990, and 2008, a grand total of 272,599 individuals. Previously, U.S. educational success was attributed to the encouragement of creative thinking, something education reformers in China, Taiwan, South Korea, and Japan sought to replicate. But U.S. educators decided to go in the opposite direction, emphasizing standardization and test scores at the expense of creativity. On the parenting side, given children little play time and letting them spend large amounts of time in front of a screen likely contributed to the trend. Creativity has real-life consequences not just in the arts but also in academia and in life outcomes.

Political views and participation

General 

In 2018, Gallup conducted a survey of almost 14,000 Americans from all 50 states and the District of Columbia aged 18 and over on their political sympathies. They found that overall, younger adults tended to lean liberal while older adults tilted conservative. (See chart.) More specifically, groups with strong conservative leanings included the elderly, residents of the Midwest and the South, and people with some or no college education. Groups with strong liberal leanings were adults with advanced degrees, whereas those with moderate liberal leanings included younger adults (18 to 29 and 30 to 49), women, and residents of the East. Gallup found little variations by income groups compared to the national average.

According to political scientists Roger Eatwell and Matthew Goodwin, early research suggests that more of the youngest of Americans legible to vote in the late 2010s identified as conservatives than members of Generation X when they were teenagers during the 1980s, at 30%. Growing up during an era of significant economic hardship and rapid ethnic change, many feel anxious about the flow of immigrants into their country. As is the case with many European countries, empirical evidence poses real challenges to the popular argument that the surge of nationalism and populism is an ephemeral phenomenon due to 'angry white old men' who would inevitably be replaced by younger and more liberal voters; there is no guarantee that the West, in general, is on a one-way trip towards a liberal and progressive future.

As of 2023, many members of Generation Z remain open to new political ideas and as such could be captured by either major political parties of the United States. Many expect more substantive information on policies before casting their vote.

Because the spend so much time on social media networks, people below the age of 30 have little concern over online privacy and national security and many oppose restrictions or bans on popular platforms, such as TikTok. Moreover, for the Democratic Party, heavily dependent on the youth vote, allowing continued access to the platform and being present on it means ensuring continued support among this age group.

Elections 
Despite the hype surrounding the political engagement and record turnout among young voters, their overall voting power has actually declined. In round terms, the share of voters between the ages of 18 and 24 will fall from 13% in 2000 to 12% in 2020 while that of voters aged 65 and over will rise from 18% to 23% during the same period, according to Richard Fry of the Pew Research Center. A consistent trend in the U.K., the U.S., and many other countries is that older people are more likely to vote than their younger countrymen, and they tend to vote for more right-leaning (or conservative) candidates. According to Sean Simpsons of Ipsos, people are more likely to vote when they have more at stake, such as children to raise, homes to maintain, and income taxes to pay.  A survey conducted before the 2020 U.S. presidential election by Barnes and Nobles Education on 1,500 college students nationwide found that just one third of respondents believe who they vote for is "private information" and three quarters of them find it difficult to find unbiased news sources.

For the first wave of Generation Z, 2018 was the first midterm election in their adult lives, where they cast 4% of the votes. A Reuters-Ipsos survey of 16,000 registered voters aged 18 to 34 conducted in the first three months of 2018 showed that support for Democratic Party among such voters fell by nine percent between 2016 and 2018 and that an increasing number favored the Republican Party's approach to the economy. This is despite the fact that almost two-thirds of young voters disapproved of the performance of Republican President Donald J. Trump. Although American voters below the age of 30 helped Joe Biden win the 2020 U.S. Presidential election, their support for him fell quickly afterwards. By late 2021, only 29% of adults in this age group approved of his performance as President whereas 50% disapproved, a gap of 21 points, the largest of all age groups. In the 2022 midterm election, voters below the age of 30 were the only major age group supporting the Democratic Party, and their numbers were large enough to prevent a 'red wave'.

Trust in the institutions 
In 2019, the Pew Research Center interviewed over 2,000 Americans aged 18 and over on their views of various components of the federal government. They found that 54% of the people between the ages of 18 and 29 wanted larger government compared to 43% who preferred smaller government and fewer services. Older people were more likely to pick the second option. 2018 polls conducted by the Pew Research Center found that 70% of Americans aged 13 to 17 wanted the government to play a more active role in solving their problems.

A 2022 poll by Pew showed that overall, medical experts, the military, and scientists were among the most trusted groups in the United States. But while a majority of Americans believed it was important for their country to remain a global leader in science, people aged 18 to 29 were somewhat less inclined to think so compared to older cohorts and were slightly more optimistic about the standing of U.S. science on the international stage.

Gun ownership 

The March for Our Lives, a protest taking place in the aftermath of the Stoneman Douglas High School shooting in 2018 was described by various media outlets as being led by students and young people. Some even describe it as the political "awakening" of Generation Z or that these protesters were "the voice of a generation on gun control." While this massive protest was indeed organized by the survivors of the Parkland shooting, albeit with the assistance of well-resourced and older benefactors, the reality was a little more complicated. According to a field survey by The Washington Post interviewing every fifth person at the protest, only ten percent of the participants were 18 years of age or younger. Meanwhile, the adult participants of the protest had an average age of just under 49. Polls conducted by Gallup and the Pew Research Center found that support for stricter gun laws among people aged 18 to 29 and 18 to 36, respectively, is statistically no different from that of the general population. According to Gallup, 57% of Americans are in favor of stronger gun control legislation. In a 2017 poll, Pew found that among the age group 18 to 29, 27% personally owned a gun and 16% lived with a gun owner, for a total of 43% living in a household with at least one gun. Nationwide, a similar percentage of American adults lived in a household with a gun. (See chart.) According to the CDC, the leading causes of death in the United States in 2016 were cancer, heart disease, accidents, chronic lower respiratory diseases, stroke, Alzheimer's disease, diabetes, influenza and pneumonia, kidney diseases, and suicide.

Economics and the environment 

Harvard University's Institute of Politics Youth Poll from 2019 found that support for single-payer universal healthcare and tuition-free free college dropped, down 8% to 47% and down 5% to 51%, respectively, if cost estimates were provided.

2018 surveys of teenagers 13 to 17 by the Pew Research Center revealed that 54% of Generation Z believed that climate change is real and is due to human activities while only 10% reject the scientific consensus on climate change.
According to a 2019 CBS News poll on 2,143 U.S. residents, 72% of Americans 18 to 44 years of age believed that it is a matter of personal responsibility to tackle climate change while 61% of older Americans did the same. In addition, 42% of American adults under 45 years old thought that the U.S. could realistically transition to 100% renewable energy by 2050 while 29% deemed it unrealistic and 29% were unsure. Those numbers for older Americans are 34%, 40%, and 25%, respectively. Differences in opinion might be due to education as younger Americans are more likely to have been taught about climate change in schools than their elders. As of 2019, only 17% of electricity in the U.S. is generated from renewable energy, of which, 7% is from hydroelectric dams, 6% from wind turbines, and 1% solar panels. There are no rivers for new dams. Meanwhile, nuclear power plants generate about 20%, but their number is declining as they are being deactivated but not replaced.

According to the Hispanic Heritage Foundation, about eight out of ten members of Generation Z identify as "fiscal conservatives." In 2018, the International Federation of Accountants released a report on a survey of 3,388 individuals aged 18 to 23 hailing from G20 countries, with a sample size of 150 to 300 per country. They found that members of Generation Z prefer a nationalist to a globalist approach to public policy by 51% to 32%, a margin of 19%.  In the United States, 52% of Generation Z wanted their government to focus more on national problems, a 24% margin. Internationally, nationalism was strongest in China (by a 44% margin), India (30%), South Africa (37%), and Russia (32%), while support for globalism was strongest in France (20% margin) and Germany (3%). In general, for members of Generation Z, the top three priorities for public policy are the stability of the national economy, the quality of education, and the availability of jobs; the bottom issues, on the other hand, were addressing income and wealth inequality, making regulations smarter and more effective, and improving the effectiveness of international taxation. Moreover, healthcare is a top priority for Generation Z in Canada, France, Germany, and the United States.

A 2018 Gallup poll found that people aged 18 to 29 have a more favorable view of socialism than capitalism, 51% to 45%. Nationally, 56% of Americans prefer capitalism compared to 37% who favor socialism. Older Americans consistently prefer capitalism to socialism. Whether the current attitudes of Millennials and Generation Z on capitalism and socialism will persist or dissipate as they grow older remains to be seen.

Abortion, sexuality, and family values 

In 2016, the Varkey Foundation and Populus conducted an international study examining the attitudes of 20,000 people aged 15 to 21 in twenty countries. They found that 66% of people aged 15 to 21 favored legal abortion. But there was significant variation among the countries surveyed. The United States stood at 63%, below France (84%), the United Kingdom (80%) but ahead of Brazil (45%), and Nigeria (24%). Gallup polls conducted in 2019 revealed that 62% of people aged 18 to 29—older members of Generation Z and younger Millennials—support giving women access to abortion while 33% opposed. In general, the older someone was, the less likely that they supported abortion. 56% of people aged 65 or over did not approve of abortion compared to 37% who did. (See chart to the right.) Gallup found in 2018 that nationwide, Americans are split on the issue of abortion, with equal numbers of people considering themselves "pro-life" or "pro-choice", 48%. In any case, many participants in the annual March for Life in Washington, D.C. in the early 2020s are members of Generation Z.

The same international survey also asked about people's viewpoints on moral questions regarding sex and gender. Overall 89% supported sexual equality, with the U.S. (90%) standing between Canada and China (both 94%) and Nigeria (68%). 74% favored recognizing transgender rights, but with large national differences, from an overwhelming majority of 83% in Canada to a bare majority of 57% in Nigeria. The U.S. was again somewhere in the middle at 75%. 63% approved of same-sex marriage. There were again huge variations among countries. 81% of young Germans and 80% of young Canadians agreed that same-sex couples should be allowed to marry, compared to only 33% of young Turks and 16% of young Nigerians who did. As before, 71% of Americans approved, putting the country somewhere in the middle.

A 2018 poll conducted by Harris on behalf of the LGBT advocacy group GLAAD found that despite being frequently described as the most tolerant segment of society, people aged 18 to 34—most Millennials and the oldest members of Generation Z—have become less accepting of LGBT individuals compared to previous years. In 2016, 63% of Americans in that age group said they felt comfortable interacting with members of the LGBT community; that number dropped to 53% in 2017 and then to 45% in 2018. On top of that, more people reported discomfort learning that a family member was LGBT (from 29% in 2017 to 36% in 2018), having a child learning LGBT history (30% to 39%), or having an LGBT doctor (27% to 34%). (See right.) Harris found that young women were driving this development; their overall comfort levels dived from 64% in 2017 to 52% in 2018. In general, the fall of comfort levels was the steepest among people aged 18 to 34 between 2016 and 2018. (Seniors aged 72 or above became more tolerant of LGBT doctors or having their (grand) children taking LGBT history lessons during the same period, albeit with a bump in discomfort levels in 2017.) Results from this Harris poll were released on the 50th anniversary of the riots that broke out in Stonewall Inn, New York City, in June 1969, thought to be the start of the LGBT rights movement. At that time, homosexuality was considered a mental illness or a crime in many U.S. states.
2018 surveys of teenagers 13 to 17 and adults aged 18 or over conducted by the Pew Research Center found that Generation Z has broadly similar views to the Millennials on various political and social issues.  67% were indifferent towards pre-nuptial cohabitation. 49% considered single motherhood to be neither a positive nor a negative for society. 62% saw increased ethnic or racial diversity as good for society. As did 48% for same-sex marriage, and 53% for interracial marriage. In most cases, Generation Z and the Millennials tended to hold different views from the Silent Generation, while the Baby Boomers and Generation X were in between. In the case of financial responsibility in a two-parent household, though, majorities from across the generations answered that it should be shared, with 58% for the Silent Generation, 73% for the Baby Boomers, 78% for Generation X, and 79% for both the Millennials and Generation Z. Across all the generations surveyed, at least 84% thought that both parents ought to be responsible for rearing children. About 13% of Generation Z thought that mothers should be the primary caretaker of children, with similar percentages for the other demographic cohorts. Very few thought that fathers should be the ones mainly responsible for taking care of children. Pew, however, noted that the views of this demographic cohort could change in the future as they age and due to new events. Even so, they could play a significant role in the shaping of the political landscape.

Immigration 

In a 2016 survey conducted by the Varkey Foundation and Populus, the question of whether or not those 15 to 21 favored legal migration received mixed responses. Overall, 31% believed their governments should make it easier for immigrants to work and live legally in their countries while 23% said it should be more difficult, a margin of 8%. In the United States, that margin of support was 16%. (See chart above.) According to Gallup, Americans aged 18 to 34 are more likely to view immigration as a "good thing" than their elders.

Foreign policy 
In 2019, Harvard University's Institute of Politics Youth Poll asked voters aged 18 to 29 – younger Millennials and the first wave of Generation Z – what they would like to be priorities for U.S. foreign policy. They found that the top issues for these voters were countering terrorism and protecting human rights (both 39%), and protecting the environment (34%). Preventing nuclear proliferation and defending U.S. allies were not as important to young American voters. The same poll also found that younger Americans are also more positive about international free trade agreements than their elders. Another poll conducted at around the same time by the Center for American Progress found that only 18% of Americans supported liberal internationalism, which has been part of U.S. foreign policy since the time of President Franklin D. Roosevelt, while young Americans were even less likely to support it, contributing to a return towards isolationism, a historical norm dating back to the Founding Fathers.

Religious tendencies

Globally, religion is growing except in Western Europe and North America. In the United States, Christianity remains the single most popular religion, with three quarters of Americans following, as of 2017. However, the nation's non-believers continued to grow in numbers in the early 2020s, a trend driven by people between the ages of 18 and 29, 32% of whom said they did not believe in God. Nevertheless, American youths are fairly religious by global standards.

In 2016, Barna found that 58% of teenagers agreed with the statement, "Many religions can lead to eternal life; there is no 'one true religion'." For adults, this number was 62%. About two-thirds of teenagers thought that "a person can be wrong about something that they sincerely believe in" whereas adults were much more likely to agree with that statement, especially the Baby Boomers (85%). 46% of adolescents require factual evidence before believing in something, on par with Millennials. Generation Z was more likely to consider the Bible to be at odds with science than older cohorts except Millennials (See chart).  The same Barna survey revealed that the percentage of atheists and agnostics was 21% among Generation Z, higher than 15% of Millennials, 13% of Generation X, and 9% of Baby Boomers.

Meanwhile, 59% of Generation Z were Christians, compared to 65% of Millennials, 65% of Generation X, and 75% of Baby Boomers. Among churchgoing teenagers, perception of this establishment tended to be overwhelmingly positive. 82% believed the church was relevant and helped them live a meaningful life. 77% thought they could be themselves at church, and 63% deemed the church to be tolerant of different beliefs. Only 27% considered the church to be unsafe for expressing doubts. 24% argued that religion and religious thought were shallow, and 17% thought it was too exclusive. When asked what their biggest barriers to faith were, irreligious members of Generation Z what they perceived as internal contradictions of the religion and its believers. 

According to the Pew Research Center, majorities of school-attending teenagers wear religious symbols and attire, pray before lunch, and invite their peers to join a religious club. Girls are more likely to discuss religion with their friends than boys. An overwhelming majority understood that teachers are not allowed to lead classroom prayers (82%). In contrast, 62% answered incorrectly that teachers may not read from the Bible as literature. While bullying has been acknowledged to be a serious problem in American public schools, students are seldom harassed for their religious views.

Risky behaviors

General trends 
Generation Z is generally more risk-averse in than previous generations. In 2013, 66% of teenagers (older members of Generation Z) had tried alcohol, down from 82% in 1991. Also, in 2013, 8% of teenagers never or rarely wear a seat belt when riding in a car with someone else, as opposed to 26% in 1991.

Research from the Annie E. Casey Foundation conducted in 2016 found Generation Z youth had lower teen pregnancy rates, less substance abuse, and higher on-time high school graduation rates compared with Millennials. The researchers compared teens from 2008 and 2014 and found a 40% drop in teen pregnancy, a 38% drop in drug and alcohol abuse, and a 28% drop in the percentage of teens who did not graduate on time from high school. Three-quarters of American twelfth-graders believed their peers disapproved of binge drinking. Indeed, members of Generation Z tend to be more worried about mental health issues and getting good grades than unplanned pregnancies or binge drinking.

Cigarette-smoking and substance abuse 

The number of American teenagers who smoked cigarettes dropped to 5.8% in 2019 from 15.8% in 2011. Indeed, this decline can be traced back to the 1990s, and has been induced by government regulations and public opinion. For comparison, that rate for adults is 14% and falling. On the other hand, electronic cigarette smoking has risen dramatically, from 1.5% in 2011 to 27.5% in 2019 (see chart), leading the federal government to consider e-cigarette smoking an epidemic. Although e-cigarettes contain nicotine, an ingredient that makes tobacco addictive, it is generally considered less harmful than its carcinogenic traditional version, which is also linked to stroke and heart disease, among other deadly conditions. According to the Center for Disease Control and Prevention (CDC), nicotine consumption has deleterious effects on the development of the brain and can affect learning, memory, and mood among young people. As of 2019, there is no evidence linking the availability of electronic cigarettes to a decline in traditional smoking among youths. However, in an anti-vaping ad, the Food and Drugs Administration stated, "Teens who vape are more likely to start smoking cigarettes." Public opinion has turned against electronic cigarettes and various state and local governments are seeking to restrict is use, especially as kid-friendly flavors are on sale.

Bloomberg reported in 2019 that members of Generation Z were twice as likely as an average American to consume cannabis. About 1% of the number of legal marijuana consumers came this demographic cohort, and that number tripled in 2019. Generation Z is the first to be born into a time when the legalization of marijuana at the federal level is being seriously considered. As of 2019, cannabis is legal in 33 U.S. states as well as in Canada and Uruguay. Even though Generation Z may not think of cannabis as anything more than a controversial issue, there is mounting concern on its effects on human health. A survey of literature reveals that marijuana usage is linked to, among other things, impaired driving, higher risks of stroke testicular cancer, memory loss, and certain mental illnesses, such as psychosis. Pregnant women, teenagers, and people prone to mental illnesses are especially vulnerable. Compared to those who do not use cannabis or those who start after they reach 16 years, people who start before that age suffer from reduced cognitive functioning (including planning and decision-making skills), and higher levels of impulsivity. About one in ten marijuana users developed a substance use disorder, meaning they continue to use it even though it causes problems in their lives, and those who use it before the age of 18 are more likely to suffer from it. Marijuana use in the United States is three times above the global average, but in line with other Western democracies. Forty-four percent of American high-school seniors have tried the drug at least once, and the typical age of first-use is 16, similar to the typical age of first-use for alcohol but lower than the first-use age for other illicit drugs.

In a 2019 study, Jean Twenge and her collaborators examined surveys from the National Survey on Drug Use and Health of 200,000 adolescents aged 13 to 17 from 2005 to 2017 and 400,000 adults aged 18 and over from 2008 to 2017. They found that while there was a marked increase in the number of teenagers and young adults reporting mental illness, there was no corresponding development among those of 26 years and up.

Early sexual intercourse and adolescent pregnancy 

Historically, the birth rate of teenagers peaked in the late 1950s and early 1960s. However, at that time, most teenage parents were married. In the early twenty-first century, nine in ten births to the age group 15-19 are to unmarried mothers.

Social norms have changed; it is now not unusual for teenagers to delay or avoid sexual intercourse altogether. Younger teenagers are more likely to practice abstinence than their older counterparts. A report published by the Center for Disease Control and Prevention (CDC) in early 2018 found the number of high school students who have had sex fell from 47% in 2005 down to 41% in 2015, with the most dramatic drop taking place between 2013 and 2015. On top of that, among never-married teens who have had sex, overwhelming majorities reported they used contraception the first time they did it. There are a few reasons for this. First, Millennials and Generation Z are more focused on the consequences of sex than their predecessors were. Second, there has been growing concern over unwanted sexual advances, especially in the wake of the Me-too movement. Numerous individuals have lost their jobs or been expelled from school over allegations of sexual assault. Writing for The Spectator, Douglas Murray dubbed this the "sexual counter-revolution." Third, as a consequence of the precarious contemporary economy, young adults today are more likely to be living with their parents rather than on their own, with a romantic partner, or a spouse.

A 2016 analysis by the CDC discovered that teenage birthrates nosedived between 1991, when they reached a crisis point, and 2014, when they dropped by 60%, a record low. The collapse of birthrates among blacks and (non-white) Hispanics, down 50%, was largely responsible for this development. However, their birthrates remained, on average, twice as high as those of their white counterparts. The birth rates of teenage Asians and Pacific Islanders were even lower, about half that of whites. In a 2014 paper, economists Melissa S. Kearney and Phillip B. Levine, both fellows of the Brookings Institution, were able to show that popular TV programs depicting the reality of teenage parenthood, such as MTV's 16 and Pregnant and its Teen Mom sequels, have played a significant role in the reduction of teenage childbearing. While the CDC did not address the question of abortion, researchers from the Guttmacher Institute were able to show that the fall in teenage birthrates is likely not due to terminated pregnancies. The number of abortions remained the same or decreased in all U.S. states except for Vermont. This contradicts the historically negative correlation between birthrates and abortions. Modern youths also have better access to contraception than did their predecessors when they were at the same age. In addition to the daily birth control pill, injectable and implantable methods are available, and they last longer. A CDC analysis found that the rates of teens using a long-acting and reversible method of contraception, such as an intrauterine device (IUD), jumped from 0.4% in 2005 to 7.1% in 2013. The teen birthrate continues to fall in the late 2010s, down to 17.4 births per 1000 in 2018.

Social trends

Upbringing 

In the United States, the Pew Research Center's analysis of data from the American Community Survey and the Decennial Census revealed that the number of children living outside of the traditional ideal of parents marrying young and staying together till death has risen precipitously between the mid-to-late 20th century and the early 21st century. In 2013, only 43% of children lived with married parents in their first marriage, down from 61% in 1980 and 73% in 1960. Meanwhile, the share of children living with a single parent was 34% in 2013, up from 19% in 1980 and 9% in 1960. The proportion of children not living with their parents barely changed, standing at 5% in 2013; most of them lived with their grandparents. 15% of American children lived with married parents at least one of whom remarried in 2013, with little change from previous decades.

In the early twenty-first century, American parents are less keen on seeing children upholding the same religious or political beliefs or following the same traditions. They are also less likely to say they would like their children to get married and have children. Rather, they emphasize ethical behavior, tolerance, generosity, and financial independence.

Parents from wealthier backgrounds are less likely to have children out of wedlock and more likely to stay married, with desirable outcomes for their children, including better social and cognitive development and educational attainment. By contrast, children born into the middle class or the lower class are less likely to have married parents than before. Upper middle-class and wealthy American couples living in the cities tend to invest heavily in their children in the form of breastfeeding for at least a year, giving them premium healthcare plans, and letting them eat organic foods. Said parents also hire nannies and housekeepers to reduce the time they spend doing house chores so that they can more time on culturally and educationally enriching activities with their children. In fact, the amount of time parents spend with their children has gone up since the mid-1960s, especially among educated couples. Having the right family background facilities the development of human capital. An early start to the accumulation of cultural capital helps children stand out from the competition as they mature, making them more likely to be admitted to prestigious universities.  Historian Tara Westover calls this the "great sorting of America's youth."

Time-spending habits and leisure 
By analyzing data collected by the Bureau of Labor Statistics, the Pew Research Center found that Americans who were aged 15–17 in the years 2014–17 spent an on average 16 more minutes doing homework and 22 more minutes asleep each day, compared to their predecessors one decade prior. However, other surveys suggest teens getting few hours of sleep each day. At the same time, they spent an average of 23 minutes less on paid jobs, and 16 minutes less on socializing each day, compared to their counterparts ten years ago. Meanwhile, the amount of time spent on sports, clothes shopping, and reading for pleasure have not changed. In general, Generation Z is less likely to engage in "fringe" behavior.

As is the case with previous generations, there were differences in how teenage boys and girls spent their free time. Boys generally spent more time on leisure activities, such as playing sports and on their electronic devices. Girls, on the other hand, spent more time on homework, housework, and activities related to appearance. Girls also spent more time on volunteering and on unpaid care work than boys. 35% of girls and 23% of boys said they felt pressured to look good.

Members of Generation Z tend to be lonelier than ever before. Despite the technological proficiency they possess, a clear majority, 72%, generally prefers person-to-person contact as opposed to online interaction.

Fashions of courtship 
Even though smartphone applications such as Tinder allow for easy hook-ups and one-night stands, Millennials and Generation Z are quite serious and cautious when it comes to long-term romantic relationships, according to Justin Garcia, who studies sex at the Kinsey Institute of Indiana University. This is in contrast to generations past, who married earlier and after shorter periods of courtship.

Data from the 2019 General Social Survey revealed that 51% of Americans aged 18 to 24 had no steady partner, higher than other cohorts. Moreover, this number has grown in recent years.

Sexual orientation and gender identity 
In February 2021, Gallup reported that 15.9% of American adults in Generation Z (those born between 1997 and 2002) identified as LGBT. Of those adults, 11.5% were bisexual while 2% said they were lesbian, gay, or transgender. Overall, a greater share American adults in Generation Z identifies as LGBT than those in previous generational cohorts.

Transportation choices 
Members of Generation Z no longer view car ownership as a status symbol. To the contrary, they tend to be frugal and savvy customers. In response to this trend, the three U.S. car manufacturers—Ford, Stellantis, and General Motors—have invested in car-sharing and car-hailing services as well as self-driving cars. However, the automotive industry hopes that, like the Millennials, members of Generation Z will later purchase cars in great numbers. The immediate predecessors of Generation Z were initially not keen on getting a driver's license or owning a vehicle thanks to new licensing laws and the state of the economy when they came of age, but the oldest among them have already begun buying cars in great numbers. In 2016, Millennials purchased more cars and trucks than any living generation except the Baby Boomers; in fact, Millennials overtook Baby Boomers in car ownership in California that year. However, 27% of Generation Z consider environmental friendliness to be an important factor, which is higher than their predecessors when they were at the same age. Much more important, though, is the price (77%). Generation Z is not particularly concerned with style or brand; they are more interested in safety. They tend to be more receptive towards self-driving cars. They are also interested in the interior electronic technology of the cars they might purchase. More specifically, they would like to be able to hook up their smartphones to the Bluetooth-capable audio systems and backup cameras.

According to the Pew Research Center, young people are more likely to ride public transit. In 2016, 21% of adults aged 18 to 21 took public transit on a daily, almost daily, or weekly basis. By contrast, this number of all U.S. adults was 11%. Nationwide, about three quarters of American commuters drive their own cars. Also according to Pew, 51% of U.S. adults aged 18 to 29 used a ride-hailing service such as Lyft or Uber in 2018 compared to 28% in 2015. That number for all U.S. adults were 15% in 2015 and 36% in 2018. In general, ride-hailing service users tend to be urban residents, young (18-29), university graduates, and high-income earners ($75,000 a year or more).

Nevertheless, the number of Generation Z consumers taking out auto loans is rising drastically, from 3,072,000 in the second quarter of 2018 to 4,376,000 in the second quarter of 2019, an increase of 42%.

Use of information and communications technologies (ICT)

Use of ICT in general 
As access to the Internet became widely available in the 1990s, members of Generation Z have been exposed to an unprecedented amount of technology since birth. With modern electronic telecommunications technology becoming more compact and affordable, the popularity of smartphones in the United States has grown exponentially. In a 2015 article for the Journal of Individual Psychology, Anthony Turner characterizes Generation Z as having a 'digital bond to the Internet', and argues that it may help youth to escape from emotional and mental struggles they face offline.

According to the Pew Research Center, "nearly three-quarters of teens have or have access to a smartphone and 30% have a basic phone, while just 12% of teens 13 to 15 say they have no cell phone of any type." The fact that an increasing majority own a cell phone has become one of the defining traits of this generation. About one quarter of teens are almost constantly online and 80% feel distressed if separated from their electronic gadgets. Generation Z spends on average six hours each day on the Internet, much of it playing video games.

Digital literacy 
Despite being labeled as 'digital natives', the 2018 International Computer and Information Literacy Study (ICILS), conducted on 42,000 eighth-graders (or equivalents) from 14 countries and educational systems, found that only two percent of these people were sufficiently proficient with information devices to justify that description, and only 19% could work independently with computers to gather information and to manage their work. ICILS assesses students on two main categories: Computer and Information Literacy (CIL), and Computational Thinking (CT). For CIL, there are four levels, one to four, with Level 4 being the highest. Although at least 80% students from most countries tested reached Level 1, only two percent on average reached Level 4. In the U.S., 90% reached Level 1, 66% Level 2, 25% Level 3, and 2% Level 4. CT is divided into four levels, the Upper, Middle, and Lower Regions. International averages for these were 18%, 50%, and 32%, respectively. U.S. results were 20%, 45%, and 35%, respectively. In general, female eighth-graders outperformed their male counterparts in CIL by an international average of 18 points but were narrowly outclassed by their male counterparts in CT. (Narrow gaps made estimates of averages have higher coefficients of variation.)  In the United States, where the computer-based tests were administered by the National Center for Education Statistics, although eighth-graders scored above the international average on CIL, being behind only students from Denmark, Moscow, South Korea, and Finland, but were about average on CT. Among American eighth-graders, 72% said they searched for information on the Internet at least once a week or every school day, and 65% reported they were autodidactic information finders on the Internet.

Use of social media networks 
Adults aged 18 to 24 stand out in their usage of social media, with 88% being on at least one platform. YouTube in particular is the top platform, with 94% of users from that age group. These people are also split on how easy it is for them to quit a certain social media network; 51% say it is hard for them to give it up. Members of Generation Z are more likely to "follow" others on social media than "share" and use different types of social media for different purposes. Very few expressed concern about third parties being able to access their data as modern teenagers share more personal information more often compared to previous generations. Majorities have uploaded photographs of themselves, stated their hobbies or interested, given their school names, posted the their locations, and revealed their relationship statuses. However, only 18% of Generation Z engaged in political conversations on social media networks.

While teens may dislike certain aspects Facebook, such as excessive sharing, they continue to use it because participation is important in terms of socializing with friends and peers. On the other hand, Twitter is gaining in popularity, with 24% of teens having a Twitter account in 2012 compared to 16% in 2011. Teens typically keep their Facebook accounts private and make their Twitter accounts public. This is partly because of the increasing number of adults on the former. Snapchat is also seen to have gained attraction in Generation Z because videos, pictures, and messages send much faster on it than in regular messaging. Speed and reliability are important factors in members of Generation Z choice of social networking platform. This need for quick communication is apparent in the popularity of apps like Vine and the prevalent use of emojis. By the early 2020s, TikTok has become one of the most popular social networks among teenagers and young adults, so much so that they are willing to ignore their own government' concerns over issues of user privacy and national security, as well as a possible nationwide ban.

A significant number of people from Generation Z have made their debut in social media before their exit from the womb, as they are the subject of their parents' social media posts. As they grow older, they do have opinions about pictures for videos of them being posted online. It is a tug-of-war between a child's privacy and a parent's pride or desire to share. While some parents do ask for their children's permission before posting, at least some of the time, others simply disregard what their children think. A 2010 report by cybersecurity firm AVG stated that 92% of American children under the age of two had a digital footprint and one in three had their information and photographs posted online within weeks after they were born. One of the reasons why children want greater control over their image online is because a college admissions officer or a prospective recruiter might look them up on the Internet. Indeed, a clear majority of employers check social media accounts during the hiring process. Over half of them decide against hiring a candidate because of what they see online; a similar number make the same decision because they could not find a prospective recruit on the Internet. As a result, members of Generation Z are careful to make themselves presentable to potential employers with their social media accounts. Not only do they take advantage of the various tools that allow them to control who sees what and are more cautious about what they post, they also try to cultivate a "personal brand" online. According to the Pew Research Center, 57% refrain from posting something if they think it might "reflect badly on them in the future." It is quite common for young people to have an alternate Instagram account, so much so that there is a name for it, "finstas," or "fake Instagram accounts."

A 2017 survey conducted by the Royal Society for Public Health found that Britons aged 14 to 24 pointed to the use of social media as having a negative impact on their general welfare. While they acknowledged that social media networks enabled self-expression and community-building, they believed such platforms caused, or exacerbated, anxiety, depression, body-image worries, exposure to cyberbullying, sleep deprivation, and fear of missing out. A survey tracking over 5,000 Americans between 2013 and 2015 found that increased use of Facebook is linked to weakening mental health. In fact, a 2014 neuroscience experiment discovered that Facebook stimulates the brain in the same manner as gambling or substance abuse. Nevertheless, the ability to control impulsive desires of social media users was less impaired than that of gamblers or drug addicts. Hence, an obvious solution to this problem is to reduce screen time. Instagram users were the most likely to report unhappiness than those of any other social media platforms while FaceTime had the highest rate of happiness. Sean Parker, the founding president of Facebook, admitted that his company was "exploiting a vulnerability in human psychology."

Online dating and romance 
While technology has added new ways for people to communicate with a romantic interest or partner, some traditions survived. Only 6% of boys waited to be asked out compared to 47% of girls. 69% of boys asked a girl out in person, compared to 45% of girls, and 27% of boys did by text messaging, compared to 25% of girls. Social media networks proved useful in helping teenage lovers strengthen their ties; this was especially true for boys. On the other hand, although boys and girls liked to use the same means of communications, texting was by far the most popular method. Girls were much more likely than boys to text their lovers daily, 79% compared to 66%.

A press release by the social media company Tinder showed that the age group 18 to 24 became the majority of users on their platform in 2019. In the U.S. the company boasted 7.86 million users in the United States that year. The most popular topics of discussion were in the fields of entertainment (especially music, film, and television) and politics (especially the key words "climate change," "social justice," "the environment," and "gun control"). For comparison, Millennials were thrice more likely to mention their travels in their autobiographical notes. According to Tinder, this was because users were trying to find like-minded users. Tinder also noted that surge in the number of matches in June might be due to the end of the school year.

See also

Organizations 
Gen-Z for Change

Related topics 

De Quervain syndrome and the thumb tribe
Puriteen

Related generations in other countries 

Post-90s Generation and Little Emperor Syndrome (China)
Strawberry Generation (Taiwan)
9X Generation (Vietnam)

Broader related issues 

List of generations
Generation gap
Cusper

Notes

References

Further reading

External links 
The Downside of Diversity. Michael Jonas. The New York Times. August 5, 2007. 
Meet Generation Z: Forget Everything You Learned About Millennials – 2014 presentation by Sparks and Honey
The Next America: Modern Family. Pew Research Center. April 30, 2014. (Video, 2:16)
Gen-Z Matters More than Millennials: Goldman Sachs' Christopher Wolf. March 4, 2016. (Video, 3:21)
The Power of Play: A Pediatric Role in Enhancing Development in Young Children. September 2018. Michael Yogman, Andrew Garner, Jeffrey Hutchinson, Kathy Hirsh-Pasek, Roberta Michnick Golinkoff. Committee on Psychosocial Aspects of Children and Family Health, Council on Communications and Media, American Academy of Pediatrics.
Religion in Public Schools. Ira C. Lupu, F. Elwood and Eleanor Davis  Professor Emeritus of Law at George Washington University Law School; David Masci, Senior Writer/Editor at Pew Research Center; and Robert W. Tuttle, David R. and Sherry Kirschner Berz Research Professor of Law & Religion at George Washington University Law School. Pew Research Center. October 3, 2019.
We asked teenagers what adults are missing about technology. This was the best response. Taylor Fang. MIT Technology Review. December 21, 2019.
Gen Y vs Z. Zeihan on Geopolitics. December 29, 2021.

20th century in the United States
21st century in the United States
Z
Demographics of the United States
Generation Z
1990s neologisms